Daniel Gamarra (born December 9, 1978 in Montevideo, Uruguay) is a Uruguayan footballer currently playing for Bucaramanga of the Primera Division B in Colombia.

Teams
  Bella Vista 1999-2001
  Tacuarembó 2002
  Bella Vista 2003
  El Tanque Sisley 2004
  Cienciano 2004
  Independiente Santa Fe 2005-2006
  Real Cartagena 2007-2008
  Patriotas 2009
  Bucaramanga 2010–present

Titles
  Cienciano 2004 (Recopa Sudamericana)

References
 
 Profile at Golgolgol

1978 births
Living people
Uruguayan footballers
Uruguayan expatriate footballers
El Tanque Sisley players
C.A. Bella Vista players
Tacuarembó F.C. players
Patriotas Boyacá footballers
Cienciano footballers
Real Cartagena footballers
Atlético Bucaramanga footballers
Categoría Primera A players
Categoría Primera B players
Expatriate footballers in Peru
Expatriate footballers in Colombia
Association football midfielders